Drug-induced keratoderma is a cutaneous condition characterized by a hornlike skin texture.

See also 
 Keratoderma
 List of cutaneous conditions

References 

Drug eruptions
Papulosquamous hyperkeratotic cutaneous conditions